Bradburia may refer to:
 Bradburia (plant), a plant genus in the family Asteraceae
 Bradburia (worm), a worm genus in the family Macrostomidae